Arroio Grande ("big rivulet") is a bairro in the District of Arroio Grande in the municipality of Santa Maria, in the Brazilian state of Rio Grande do Sul. It is situated in northeast of Santa Maria.

Villages 
The bairro contains the following villages: Arroio do Meio, Arroio Grande, Arroio Lobato, Cidade dos Meninos, Colônia Nova, Faxinal da Palma, Kipper, Linha Canudos, Noal, Nossa Senhora da Saúde, Rosalino Noal, São Marcos, São Valentin, Três Barras, Vila Arroio Grande, Vila Fighera, Vila Santa Brígida.

Gallery of photos

References 

Bairros of Santa Maria, Rio Grande do Sul